General elections were held in the British Virgin Islands in 1954 for seats on the Legislative Council of the British Virgin Islands.

The previous election in 1950 had elected four members to the council on the basis of a Territory-wide vote.  The 1954 election was the first election to employ districting.  The Territory was divided into five districts, the largest of which (the 2nd District - Road Town) would have two members.  All seats were contested.

Results
At the time candidates were not affiliated with political parties.  Notable candidates who were elected for the first time included Theodolph Faulkner, remembered for his key role in relation to the reintroduction of democracy in the British Virgin Islands.

References

Elections in the British Virgin Islands
British Virgin
General election
British Virgin
Election and referendum articles with incomplete results